Letcombe Bassett is a village and civil parish about  southwest of the market town of Wantage in the Vale of White Horse. It was part of Berkshire until the 1974 boundary changes transferred the Vale of White Horse to Oxfordshire. The 2011 Census recorded the parish population as 148.  The village is a spring line settlement, being the source of Letcombe Brook at the foot of the Berkshire Downs escarpment.  Hackpen, Warren & Gramp's Hill Downs Site of Special Scientific Interest is in the parish.

Parish church
The Church of England parish church of Saint Michael and All Angels is a Grade II* listed building. St Michael's parish is part of the Ridgeway Benefice, along with the parishes of Childrey, Kingston Lisle, Letcombe Regis, Sparsholt and West Challow.

References

Bibliography

External links

Civil parishes in Oxfordshire
Vale of White Horse
Villages in Oxfordshire